Eduardo Gory Guerrero Llanes (October 9, 1967 – November 13, 2005) was an American professional wrestler. A prominent member of the Guerrero wrestling family, being the son of first-generation wrestler Gory Guerrero, he is widely considered one of the greatest professional wrestlers of all time. 

Guerrero performed in Mexico and Japan for several major professional wrestling promotions, and in the United States he performed for Extreme Championship Wrestling (ECW), World Championship Wrestling (WCW), and most notably World Wrestling Federation/Entertainment (WWF/WWE). Guerrero's gimmick was that of a "Latino Heat", a crafty, resourceful wrestler who would do anything to win a match. His catchphrase became "I Lie! I Cheat! I Steal!" and was used in one of his entrance themes; he partly used this phrase in the title of his 2005 autobiography, Cheating Death, Stealing Life. Despite being a heel for most of his career, he was popular in and out of the ring and was at the peak of his career as a face during 2003–2005, becoming the top wrestler on the SmackDown brand in 2004. He experienced various substance abuse problems, including alcoholism and an addiction to painkillers; these real-life issues were sometimes incorporated into his storylines.

Guerrero spent his early career wrestling in Mexican promotions and forming a popular tag team with Art Barr. After the death of Barr, Guerrero received his first mainstream exposure in the United States in 1995 by joining ECW and winning the ECW World Television Championship. Later that year, Guerrero moved to WCW, where he became WCW United States Champion and WCW Cruiserweight Champion and also led the Latino World Order. He left WCW in 2000 after the company failed to elevate him to a main event spot.

He moved to WWF during the Attitude Era with his WCW colleagues Chris Benoit, Dean Malenko and Perry Saturn, who formed a group called The Radicalz. Guerrero went on to win the WWF European Championship and WWF Intercontinental Championship before he was released in 2001 due to addiction issues. After being rehired in 2002, he formed Los Guerreros with his nephew Chavo, winning the WWE Tag Team Championship, and established himself on the SmackDown brand. He climbed to main event status and won the WWE Championship, his sole world championship at No Way Out 2004. He lost the title later that year but remained a popular main eventer until his death on November 13, 2005.

He was posthumously inducted into the WWE, AAA, Wrestling Observer Newsletter and Hardcore halls of fame.

Early life 
Guerrero was born and raised in El Paso, Texas, where he graduated from Thomas Jefferson High School (La Jeff) in 1985. He attended the University of New Mexico, and then New Mexico Highlands University on an athletic scholarship. It was there that Guerrero entered collegiate wrestling before moving to Mexico to train as a professional wrestler. He followed in the footsteps of his brothers and father, who had also wrestled in Mexico. As a boy, he would attend the wrestling promotions held by his father Gory Guerrero at the El Paso County Coliseum. Guerrero's father allowed him and his nephew Chavo to wrestle each other during intermissions.

Professional wrestling career

Early career (1986–1992)
Guerrero debuted in 1986. In 1989 he appeared with World Championship Wrestling as a jobber, most notably wrestling Terry Funk. In 1991, he would return for WrestleWar, wrestling a dark match, teaming with Ultraman to defeat Huichol and Rudy Boy Gonzalez. Guerrero wrestled as the original Mascara Magica in CMLL until his departure in 1992. He then left the company to pursue a career with AAA. Although the Mascara Magica gimmick was popular, CMLL owned the rights to the character. Guerrero then appeared on a televised AAA show as Mascara Magica, only to then unmask himself along with the aide of his tag team partner that night, Octagón. Being physically attacked by the opposing tag team for doing so.

Asistencia Asesoría y Administración (1992–1995) 

In Mexico, Guerrero wrestled mainly for Asistencia Asesoría y Administración (AAA), teaming with El Hijo del Santo as the new version of La Pareja Atómica (The Atomic Pair), the tag team of Gory Guerrero and El Santo.

After Guerrero turned on Santo and allied with Art Barr as "la Pareja del Terror" ("the Pair of Terror"), the duo became arguably the most hated tag team in lucha libre history. Along with Barr, Konnan, Chicano Power, and Madonna's Boyfriend, Guerrero formed los Gringos Locos ("the Crazy Americans"), a villainous stable. Guerrero later said that no matter how many people joined los Gringos Locos, the stable was all about Barr. Locos feuded mostly with El Hijo del Santo and his partner Octagón, eventually ending in a Hair vs. Mask match at the first Lucha pay-per-view in America, When Worlds Collide, which they lost.

Guerrero and Barr's first break would come when they were noticed in late-1994 by the owner of Extreme Championship Wrestling (ECW), Paul Heyman, and were approached about wrestling for him in 1995. Barr, however, died before he could join ECW with Guerrero.

New Japan Pro-Wrestling (1992–1996) 
In 1992, Guerrero began wrestling in Japan for New Japan Pro-Wrestling (NJPW), where he was known as the second incarnation of Black Tiger. He became more successful upon his return when he won the 1996 Best of the Super Juniors tournament of junior heavyweights. He received a shot at the IWGP Junior Heavyweight Champion The Great Sasuke at Skydiving J, but lost the match.

Extreme Championship Wrestling (1995) 
Guerrero won the ECW World Television Championship from 2 Cold Scorpio in his debut match for Extreme Championship Wrestling on April 8, 1995, at Three Way Dance. He went on to have a series of acclaimed matches with Dean Malenko before they both signed with World Championship Wrestling later that year. Guerrero lost the ECW Television Championship to Malenko on July 21 of that year, but Guerrero regained the title on July 28. Guerrero lost the ECW Television Championship back to 2 Cold Scorpio on August 25. The next day, they had their last match which ended in a draw in a two out of three falls match at the ECW Arena. After the match, the locker room emptied and the two were carried around the ring by their fellow wrestlers while the crowd chanted "please don't go".

World Championship Wrestling (1995–2000)

Debut; championship reigns (1995–1997) 
Guerrero returned to WCW in late 1995 along with Dean Malenko and Chris Benoit with whom he had worked with in NJPW and ECW. During his first few pay-per-view events, he competed in dark matches against Alex Wright. His first televised pay-per-view appearance was at World War 3 where he competed in the 3-ring, 60-man World War 3 battle royal for the vacant WCW World Heavyweight Championship. Guerrero was one of the final nine men in the battle royal (notably being one of only two men in the group to be under the age of 35, the other being The Giant) until he was tossed out of the ring by Four Horsemen members. At Starrcade: World Cup of Wrestling in December 1995, Guerrero represented WCW in a WCW vs. NJPW World Cup tournament, which saw him losing to Shinjiro Otani in the match, but WCW would go on to win the series at 4–3.

In 1996, Guerrero received several shots at the United States Heavyweight Championship against Konnan at Uncensored and Ric Flair at Hog Wild. He feuded with Ric Flair and the Four Horsemen during 1996 after Guerrero's partner Arn Anderson turned on him during a tag team match against Ric Flair and Randy Savage. In late 1996, he feuded with Diamond Dallas Page after defeating him in a match at Clash of the Champions XXXIII. He started feuding with DDP to steal his nickname of "Lord of the Ring", but lost. Guerrero participated in a tournament for the vacant WCW United States Heavyweight Championship and defeated DDP in the final round at Starrcade to win the United States title in December 1996.

In 1997, Guerrero defended the United States Heavyweight Championship against Scott Norton at Clash of the Champions XXXIV, Syxx in a ladder match at Souled Out, and Chris Jericho at SuperBrawl VII. His reign came to an end at Uncensored when Dean Malenko defeated him for the title.

After losing the United States Heavyweight Championship, Guerrero feuded with Jericho focusing on Jericho's Cruiserweight Championship. He challenged Jericho for the title at Clash of the Champions XXXV but lost. Guerrero demanded a rematch for the title. In the opening match of Fall Brawl, Guerrero defeated Jericho to win the WCW World Cruiserweight Championship. He dropped the Cruiserweight title to Rey Mysterio Jr. at Halloween Havoc in a title vs. mask match where Mysterio's mask was also on the line. On the November 10 episode of Monday Nitro, he regained the Cruiserweight title from Mysterio, and made a successful title defense against Mysterio at World War 3. After retaining the title against Dean Malenko in the opening bout of Starrcade in December 1997, Guerrero dropped the title to Último Dragón the following day on the December 29 episode of Nitro.

Latino World Order; Filthy Animals (1998–2000) 

On the March 9, 1998 episode of Nitro, Guerrero's nephew Chavo Guerrero lost to Booker T in a match. After the match, Guerrero delivered a suplex to Chavo for the main purpose of  teaching him a lesson. On the March 12 episode of Thunder, he defeated his nephew Chavo in a match and forced him to become his "slave". At Uncensored, Chavo was forced to support Guerrero when he faced Booker T for Booker's WCW World Television Championship. Guerrero lost the match after receiving a missile dropkick. Guerrero and Chavo feuded with Último Dragón. Chavo lost to Dragón at Spring Stampede. At Slamboree, Guerrero defeated Dragón despite interference from Chavo. After the match, Chavo kissed Eddie and began to display insane behavior. At The Great American Bash, Chavo got an upset victory over Guerrero. They faced each other in a hair vs. hair match at Bash at the Beach which Guerrero won. Continuing to show his crazy behavior Chavo would shave his own head while Guerrero looked on in disbelief. Guerrero saved Chavo from beatings by Stevie Ray, seeming that he would align with Chavo but he wanted his release.

Despite his success and popularity, Guerrero had been one of many wrestlers who were frustrated at never being given a chance to be main event stars in WCW. These frustrations came to a head when Guerrero requested that WCW President Eric Bischoff either push his character or give him a raise for family reasons. Bischoff responded by allegedly throwing coffee at Guerrero (however, in his autobiography, Guerrero states that Bischoff accidentally knocked his coffee off the table and that it was a complete accident that he was hit). Furious, Guerrero demanded Bischoff release him from his contract on a live episode of Nitro. Guerrero then left the company for months, angry at Bischoff for what he had done. Guerrero later returned to WCW, leading to the belief that maybe Guerrero's angry speeches against Bischoff were a work (Guerrero later confirmed it to be a worked shoot). Guerrero would later contradict himself on WWE's DVD Monday Night War claiming that he tried to put personal differences aside for the good of the company, yet found himself angry and outraged once more because of Bischoff's supposed continued refusal to elevate Guerrero and other similar wrestlers. He let Brian Adams pin him and get an upset victory in a match.

On-screen, Guerrero responded to Bischoff's actions by forming the Latino World Order (LWO), which was a take-off of Bischoff's New World Order. The group was an answer to Bischoff's "refusal" to push Latino wrestlers in ways they felt they deserved. The LWO was formed in October when Guerrero returned to WCW, with Héctor Garza and Damien. The group eventually grew to encompass almost all the Mexican wrestlers working for WCW at the time. They mainly feuded with Rey Mysterio Jr. and Billy Kidman because they wanted Mysterio to join the group. He faced Kidman in a match for the WCW Cruiserweight Championship, but Mysterio interfered and helped Kidman win the match and keep the title. However, Guerrero was involved in a car accident on New Year's Day 1999 that cut short the LWO storyline.

After his return on the May 31, 1999 episode of Monday Nitro, Guerrero became a founding member of the Filthy Animals alongside Rey Mysterio Jr. and Konnan. They feuded with the Dead Pool (Insane Clown Posse and Vampiro). They received two straight victories over the Dead Pool at Road Wild and Fall Brawl. They next feuded with Revolution (Shane Douglas, Chris Benoit, Dean Malenko, and Perry Saturn). Guerrero was victorious over Saturn by disqualification in a singles match at Halloween Havoc. At Mayhem, the Animals lost to Revolution in a mixed tag team elimination match. When Vince Russo was fired as WCW booker and replaced by Kevin Sullivan, Guerrero asked for and received a release from his contract on January 19, 2000. He signed with the World Wrestling Federation (WWF) in 2000 along with fellow WCW stars Benoit, Malenko, and Saturn.

World Wrestling Federation (2000–2001) 

Guerrero, Chris Benoit, Dean Malenko and Perry Saturn debuted in the WWF on the January 31, 2000 episode of Raw Is War as The Radicalz, interfering in a match involving The New Age Outlaws. establishing themselves as faces. During his first match with the WWF, a tag team match with Perry Saturn against The New Age Outlaws, Guerrero performed a frog splash off the top rope and dislocated his elbow when he landed the move; as a result, he was sidelined for several weeks. Guerrero and Saturn had originally been booked to defeat The New Age Outlaws, but due to his injury, Guerrero panicked and told Road Dogg, who was in the tag team match with Billy Gunn against Guerrero and Saturn, to immediately pin him.
After losing their "tryout matches" upon entry, The Radicalz aligned themselves with WWF Champion Triple H and became a heel faction.

In March, Guerrero, who was wrestling as a heel, began pursuing the affections of Chyna, who he referred to as his "Mamacita". At the time, Chyna was allies with Chris Jericho and initially rejected his advances. The night after WrestleMania 2000, on the April 3, 2000 episode of Raw Is War, Guerrero faced off against Jericho for the European Championship. During the match, Chyna turned on Jericho and helped Guerrero win, and later explained her actions by declaring that she could not resist his "Latino Heat". After Guerrero abandoned Lita to be attacked by The Dudley Boyz, he and Chyna began a feud with Essa Rios and Lita, ending in a European title defense at Backlash, which was also billed as the night of Guerrero's prom (he was said to have just earned a GED). Guerrero defeated Rios after arriving at ringside in a 1957 Chevrolet, even wrestling in his tuxedo pants and a bow tie. Guerrero turned face and successfully retained the title against former Radicalz friends Saturn and Malenko in a triple threat match at Judgment Day, before losing the title to Saturn at Fully Loaded. The two slowly began to become popular with the fans, but over the next few months friction began to build between Guerrero and Chyna.

Chyna was upset when Guerrero pinned her to advance in the King of the Ring tournament. Then at SummerSlam that August, Guerrero and Chyna wrestled an Intergender tag team match against Trish Stratus and Val Venis, who at the time was the reigning Intercontinental Champion. The Intercontinental Championship was on the line in the match, and whoever scored the pin would win the title. Guerrero's team won the match, but Chyna scored the pin on Trish and became a two-time Intercontinental Champion. Although Guerrero said he did not mind that his partner was the champion, on the September 4 episode of Raw Is War he went to WWF Commissioner Mick Foley and asked to be inserted into Chyna's title defense against Kurt Angle claiming that he did not want Angle to hurt his "mamacita". During the course of the match, Angle knocked down Chyna with the title belt and Guerrero laid on top of her to try to revive her. However, this resulted in Guerrero "accidentally" pinning Chyna as her shoulders were still on the mat, and thus Guerrero won the match and his first Intercontinental Championship. Chyna became visibly uncomfortable as Guerrero began to cheat in order to retain his title, while Guerrero was upset that Chyna was posing for Playboy magazine, even trying to invade the Playboy Mansion to stop the photo shoot. Just when it appeared that Chyna would leave Guerrero, he proposed to her and she accepted. At Unforgiven, Chyna helped Guerrero in retaining his title against Rikishi. The engagement was called off when Guerrero was caught showering with two of The Godfather's hos (one of whom would later wrestle as Victoria) claiming that "two Mamacitas are better than one".

Guerrero turned heel again as a result of the incident. Then, The Radicalz reunited and feuded with the reformed D-Generation X (Chyna, Billy Gunn, Road Dogg, and K-Kwik). They defeated D-Generation X at Survivor Series in an elimination tag team match and assisted Triple H in his match with Stone Cold Steve Austin. Guerrero was later defeated by Gunn for the Intercontinental Championship on the Thanksgiving episode of SmackDown!. At Rebellion, Guerrero and Malenko lost to Gunn and Chyna. Benoit left the group to focus on a singles career while the rest of The Radicalz feuded with Lita and The Hardy Boyz (Matt and Jeff). At Armageddon, The Radicalz defeated The Hardy Boyz and Lita in an elimination tag team match.

In early 2001, Guerrero feuded with Chris Jericho, Benoit, and X-Pac over Jericho's Intercontinental Championship. At No Way Out, the four men faced each other in a fatal four-way match, which Jericho won. Guerrero focused on the European Championship, feuding with the champion Test defeating him at WrestleMania X-Seven to win his second European Championship with help from Saturn and Malenko. In April, The Radicalz feuded with Test and his partners. Guerrero eventually left the Radicalz, siding with The Hardy Boyz and Lita. At this point, Guerrero developed an addiction to pain medication stemming from his 1999 car accident and in May 2001 was sent to rehab, missing the entire Invasion storyline featured his former fellow WCW (and later ECW) wrestlers. To explain his absence, a storyline was created where Guerrero was "injured" by Albert in a match. On November 9, 2001, he was arrested for drunk driving and was subsequently released by the WWF three days later.

Independent circuit (2001–2002) 
Guerrero started wrestling on the independent circuit after his release from the WWF. On February 23, 2002, he faced Super Crazy on the debut show of Ring of Honor known as The Era of Honor Begins to crown the first-ever IWA Intercontinental Champion. Guerrero lost the match. On February 24, he debuted in the Australian promotion World Wrestling All-Stars (WWA) at The Revolution beating the champion Juventud Guerrera and Psicosis in a Triple Threat match for the WWA International Cruiserweight Championship. On March 1, he defeated the champion CM Punk and Rey Mysterio in a Triple Threat match for the IWA Mid-South Heavyweight Championship. He dropped the title back to Punk one day later on March 2. He vacated the WWA Cruiserweight title in April 2002 after returning to the WWF.

Return to New Japan (2002) 
Guerrero also returned to New Japan Pro-Wrestling (NJPW) for a brief period in March 2002, this time unmasked. He aligned himself with the villainous Team 2000 stable, and primarily teamed with Black Tiger.

Return to WWF/WWE (2002–2005)

Teaming with Chris Benoit (2002) 
Guerrero returned to the WWF on the April 1, 2002 episode of Raw, attacking Rob Van Dam. He feuded with Van Dam, defeating him for his second Intercontinental Championship at Backlash. After retaining the title against Van Dam at Insurrextion and Judgment Day, he finally lost the title to Van Dam on the May 27 episode of Raw in a ladder match in which a fan in an Edmonton Oilers jersey pushed him off a ladder. Guerrero then feuded with Stone Cold Steve Austin, but Austin left the WWE before a match could take place. Chris Benoit returned to WWE the night Guerrero lost the title and reunited with him. Guerrero and Benoit feuded with Ric Flair for a while and Guerrero lost a match to Flair at King of the Ring.

On August 1, 2002, Guerrero and Benoit moved to WWE's SmackDown! brand. Guerrero feuded with Edge, to whom he lost at SummerSlam. Guerrero continued his feud with Edge, whom he defeated at Unforgiven; they then had a no disqualification match four days after Unforgiven on SmackDown! which Edge won thus ending the rivalry.

Los Guerreros and championship reigns (2002–2004) 

With Benoit focusing on Kurt Angle, Guerrero aligned himself with his nephew Chavo, forming the tag team Los Guerreros. In contrast to a previous WCW storyline with his nephew, Chavo fully agreed with his uncle as their slogan stated: "We lie, we cheat, and we steal, but at least we're honest about it". To push the new tag team, vignettes were produced, which included things such as the two finagling their way into a rich lady's house and throwing a pool party. These segments marked the beginning of the rise of popularity for the team, especially Eddie, who continued to use the mannerisms.

The duo entered the eight-team tournament for the new WWE Tag Team Championship, sneaking past Rikishi and Mark Henry in the opening round, before starting a feud with the newly formed tag team of Kurt Angle and Chris Benoit. In one of the team's definitive moments, Chavo told Benoit that his former friend Guerrero was assaulted by his tag team partner Angle. Benoit ran to make the save, only to have himself locked inside a room. Guerrero then appeared in the room and assaulted Benoit with a steel chair. Benoit and Angle managed to overcome their differences and eventually defeated Los Guerreros in the tournament semi-finals. Later on, Benoit and Angle won the title. Benoit and Angle then fought for a trophy for being the first WWE Tag Team Champions. Much to Benoit's surprise, Los Guerreros helped him win the match.

At Survivor Series, Los Guerreros faced the new champions Edge and Rey Mysterio and the team of Kurt Angle and Chris Benoit for the titles. Guerrero made Mysterio submit to the Lasso from El Paso to win their first WWE Tag Team Championship. They turned face due to their popularity. They lost the titles to Team Angle (Charlie Haas and Shelton Benjamin) on the February 6, 2003 episode of SmackDown!. Los Guerreros and Team Angle began feuding with each other. Los Guerreros participated at WrestleMania XIX as contenders for the WWE Tag Team Championship, along with the team of Chris Benoit and Rhyno. Both teams lost to Team Angle in a triple threat match. At Backlash, Los Guerreros lost to Team Angle in a rematch.

Five days prior to Judgment Day, his real-life nephew Chavo tore his biceps and forcing Guerrero to look for another partner. He chose Tajiri, and they won the WWE Tag Team Championship, Guerrero's second and Tajiri's first at Judgment Day by defeating Team Angle in a ladder match. The following week, Guerrero and Tajiri managed to retain their titles against Team Angle by cheating. They also defeated Roddy Piper and his protégé Sean O'Haire in Madison Square Garden on the June 26 episode of SmackDown!. After Guerrero and Tajiri lost the WWE Tag Team Championship to The World's Greatest Tag Team (previously Team Angle) on the July 3 episode of SmackDown!, Guerrero turned on Tajiri, slamming his partner through the windshield of his low-rider truck, turning heel once again.

In July 2003, Guerrero competed in a tournament for the WWE United States Championship. He managed to advance to the final round, defeating Último Dragón and Billy Gunn in the process, where he would meet Chris Benoit. At Vengeance, Guerrero turned to his cheating tactics, hitting Benoit with the belt at one point in the match. Guerrero tried to get Benoit in trouble by placing the title belt on top of the unconscious Benoit. It did not work, however, since he knocked out the referee earlier with a championship belt shot to the kidneys. The match ended with interference and a Gore from Rhyno, Benoit's partner, who was furious at the team's failure. Guerrero pinned Benoit and won the United States Championship.

At SummerSlam, Guerrero retained his title by defeating Rhyno, Benoit, and Tajiri in a fatal four-way match. He quickly reverted to being a face by engaging in a rivalry with John Cena. On the September 11 episode of SmackDown!, Guerrero challenged Cena to a "Latino Heat" Parking Lot Brawl match for the United States Championship, which Guerrero won with help from his returning nephew, Chavo. The next week on SmackDown!, Los Guerreros defeated The World's Greatest Tag Team to win the WWE Tag Team Championship, making Guerrero a double champion (beginning Guerrero's third tag title reign).

Guerrero engaged in a feud with Big Show, which involved Guerrero giving Big Show some laxative laced burritos and then later spraying Big Show from a sewage truck. The feud ended when Guerrero lost the United States Championship to Big Show at No Mercy. Four days later, Los Guerreros lost the WWE Tag Team Championship to the Basham Brothers (Danny and Doug). They began feuding with the Basham Brothers, but failed to regain the championship at Survivor Series. As Los Guerreros attempted to regain the tag team titles, things began to go downhill between Chavo and Eddie, as animosity began to build. Chavo then attacked and turned on Guerrero after he suffered a beating from the Basham Brothers on the January 8, 2004 episode of SmackDown!. Guerrero feuded with Chavo and defeated him at the Royal Rumble to settle their feud. After the match Eddie attacked Chavo causing him to bleed.

WWE Champion (2004) 

When Chris Benoit jumped to the Raw brand after winning the Royal Rumble match, using his title shot to go for Triple H's World Heavyweight Championship, Guerrero won a 15-man Royal Rumble match on the January 29, 2004 episode of SmackDown! to earn a shot at the WWE Championship. After becoming the number one contender, Guerrero elevated himself to main event status and began feuding with the WWE Champion Brock Lesnar. At No Way Out, Guerrero defeated Lesnar in a shocking upset victory in the main event to win the WWE Championship. The victory made him a Triple Crown and Grand Slam Champion in the process. His next feud was with Kurt Angle, whom he defeated at WrestleMania XX to retain his title in his first big defense. At the end of this event, Guerrero celebrated in the ring with longtime friend Chris Benoit, who had just won the World Heavyweight Championship.

In March, he started a feud with fellow Texan John "Bradshaw" Layfield (JBL) after JBL interrupted Guerrero's title match with Booker T. The rivalry would soon turn personal when at a non-televised live event, JBL caused Guerrero's mother to suffer a (kayfabe) heart attack while in attendance at ringside. At Judgment Day, Guerrero defended his WWE title against JBL, retaining the title after getting himself disqualified, hitting JBL with the championship title. The match witnessed Guerrero bleed heavily mid-way in the match as a result of Guerrero performing a bladejob after a stiff headshot ringside with a chair from JBL. It was later explained that he cut too deep, thus hitting an artery. After the match concluded, Guerrero was persuaded to go to hospital by WWE producer Bruce Prichard where his wound was stitched up and he received IV fluids.

At The Great American Bash, Guerrero defended the title against JBL in a Texas bullrope match. JBL won after Kurt Angle (who was General Manager of SmackDown! at the time) reversed the decision after Guerrero appeared to have retained the title. On the July 8 episode of SmackDown!, Guerrero pulled a switcharoo with Shannon Moore, who was wrestling as "El Gran Luchadore" and wore the costume. On the July 15 episode of SmackDown!, Guerrero faced JBL in a steel cage match for the WWE title where El Gran Luchadore appeared again and cost Guerrero the match; he later revealed himself as Kurt Angle. Guerrero continued his feud with Angle.

Final storylines (2004–2005) 
At SummerSlam, Guerrero lost to Angle after submitting to his ankle lock. Guerrero then allied himself with Big Show. Each week Angle and his new allies Luther Reigns and Mark Jindrak began targeting Guerrero and Big Show. Guerrero defeated Reigns in a singles match at No Mercy. General Manager Theodore Long booked a Survivor Series Elimination match between a team led by Guerrero and a team led by Angle. Guerrero's team consisted of himself, Big Show, John Cena (replacing the originally chosen Rey Mysterio), and Rob Van Dam. At Survivor Series, Guerrero's team defeated Angle's team. Guerrero, along with Booker T and The Undertaker, then challenged JBL for a WWE Championship rematch. Along the way, Guerrero found a partner in Booker T. At Armageddon, Guerrero and Booker's initial teamwork broke away, and the match ended with JBL pinning Booker following the Clothesline From Hell. Afterwards, Guerrero and Booker briefly and unsuccessfully attempted to win the WWE Tag Team Championship.

At the Royal Rumble, Guerrero entered the Royal Rumble match at No. 1 and lasted 28:11 before being eliminated by Edge. In a skit before the Royal Rumble match, he drew his number the same time Ric Flair drew his. In an attempt to get a better draw, Guerrero switched his number with Flair's (and stole Flair's wallet in the process). Theodore Long made him return both items before the match. Flair would enter at No. 30. At No Way Out, Guerrero teamed up with longtime friend and sometimes rival, Rey Mysterio and defeated the Basham Brothers to win his final title, the WWE Tag Team Championship for a fourth time, with it being Mysterio's third reign. Many expected the new champions to defend their title at WrestleMania 21, but after encouragement from Chavo, Guerrero challenged Mysterio to a one-on-one match instead so they could "bring the house down". The two wrestled a match at WrestleMania with Mysterio getting the win. Although visibly frustrated, Guerrero congratulated his partner. After several mishaps in the weeks following WrestleMania, the growing tension between Guerrero and Mysterio finally erupted when they lost the WWE Tag Team Championship to the new team MNM (Johnny Nitro and Joey Mercury) on the April 21 episode of SmackDown!. Although the next week they received a rematch to regain the titles, Guerrero abandoned Mysterio, whom he had considered "his family" earlier in the show, costing them the match.

At the end of the May 5 episode of SmackDown!, he saved Mysterio from an attack by Chavo and MNM, before attacking Mysterio, leaving him bruised and bloody after suplexing him onto a set of steel steps, turning heel in the process. Guerrero then adopted a new, brooding gimmick. During this time, he also stopped driving his low-riders down the ring and walked to the ring slowly with a frown on his face, gained a new theme which was a darker remix of "Lie, Cheat, And Steal" and started using his other finishing move, the Lasso from El Paso, more often. At Judgment Day, Guerrero lost to Mysterio by disqualification after hitting Mysterio with a chair.

On the June 30 episode of SmackDown!, Guerrero threatened to reveal a secret about Mysterio and his son Dominik. The storyline grew to involve the families of both men, with both sides pleading for Guerrero not to reveal the secret. Mysterio defeated Guerrero again at The Great American Bash, a match with a stipulation that if Guerrero lost, he would not tell the secret. Yet Guerrero revealed the secret anyway on the following episode of SmackDown! – telling Dominik and the audience that Guerrero was his real father. In the following weeks, Guerrero revealed the details of the secret in a series of what he called "Eddie's Bedtime Stories". During that time he now had a dark comical gimmick. He claimed that he had a child out of wedlock (Dominik) while his marriage was going through hard times. He claimed he then allowed Mysterio and his wife, who were "having trouble conceiving", to adopt the child as their own. At SummerSlam, Guerrero lost a ladder match over Dominik's custody to Mysterio. On the September 9 episode of SmackDown!, their feud ended when Guerrero defeated Mysterio in a steel cage match.

Following his feud with Mysterio, Guerrero was named number one contender to the World Heavyweight Championship and given a title match with Batista. Despite this, Guerrero quickly proclaimed himself to be Batista's friend. Batista was well aware of Guerrero's sneaky reputation, and despite eventually accepting his friendship (initially to keep an eye on him), Batista would continually play mind games with Guerrero to expose his true intentions. A series of matches with MNM only supported Batista's suspicions that Guerrero was up to no good, as Guerrero appeared to have reverted to his cheating ways. In response to Batista's suspicions, Guerrero helped Batista win a match against his tag team partners, JBL and Christian. Batista defeated Guerrero at No Mercy to retain the World Heavyweight Championship in what would be Guerrero's last pay-per-view match. During the match, Guerrero struggled with a decision about whether or not to use a steel chair to secure the victory, eventually opting not to use it and losing as a result. He would make his entrance the following SmackDown! using his signature low rider and old entrance theme with Batista, and turning him face once again. Guerrero wrestled in his last match on the November 11 episode of SmackDown!, defeating Mr. Kennedy by disqualification using his signature lie, cheat, and steal tactics, which allowed him to advance to the SmackDown! Survivor Series team. After the match, Kennedy hitting him with a steel chair. On the date of his death, a triple threat match between himself, Batista, and Randy Orton was supposed to take place to air on the following episode of SmackDown! for the World Heavyweight Championship, in which Guerrero had been booked to win the title so Batista could take time off to heal from an injured back , but that was later denied by Batista in his own book. Orton was given Guerrero's spot in the traditional Survivor Series elimination match between the Raw and SmackDown! brands, which SmackDown! would win, with Orton being the sole survivor.

Professional wrestling style and persona 
After the death of his friend Art Barr, Guerrero started to use the frog splash as a finisher. He also used to perform 3 sequential suplexes, calling the triad the "Three Amigos”. He would also use a variation of the Texas cloverleaf and called it the Lasso from El Paso. Often included in his matches, Eddie would employ what commentator Tazz would refer to as “The Smoking Gun;” a chair, championship belt, or other unauthorized item and toss it to his opponent as the referee turned around from a distraction. As the referee began assessing the issue or returning the item to its original location, Eddie would gain an advantage of some sort to win the match. Some matches had Eddie smack a chair on the mat and toss the chair to his opponent and lie on the ground. When the referee turned around and saw the opponent had the chair, they would call a disqualification and the match would end in Eddie's favor.

Other media 

On March 13, 2004, Guerrero (WWE Champion), along with Big Show, Trish Stratus and Chris Jericho, made a guest appearance on MADtv as he and the other wrestlers "beat up" Frank Caliendo (portraying Jay Leno) while Aries Spears (portraying The Tonight Show Band leader Kevin Eubanks) watched on. There have also been several DVDs and books released about his life and career, including Cheating Death, Stealing Life: The Eddie Guerrero Story (DVD, 2004), Cheating Death, Stealing Life: The Eddie Guerrero Story (book, released on December 5, 2005), and Viva La Raza: The Legacy of Eddie Guerrero (DVD 2008). Additionally, the song "We Lie, We Cheat, We Steal" that he performed with Chavo was released on the WWE Originals CD.

Guerrero's catchphrase during the latter part of his career with WWE was "Viva La Raza" (which is Spanish for "Long Live the Race"). In the mid parts of his career, Guerrero took the title of "Latino Heat", which was also his theme song in the early 2000s. He has also been featured in WWE's Best Smackdown matches video of its 15-year Friday Night span, upon the show being moved to Thursday nights on Thursday, January 15, 2015, he features in 5 of the top 15 matches including the number 1 spot where his No Disqualification bout with Edge topped the list of best Smackdown matches.

Video games

Personal life 
Guerrero married Vickie Guerrero on April 24, 1990, and had two daughters: Shaul Marie Guerrero and Sherilyn Amber Guerrero. During a two-year separation from Vickie, he had a relationship with a woman named Tara Mahoney. During this relationship, Tara gave birth to Guerrero's third daughter, Kaylie Marie Guerrero. Guerrero was close friends with fellow wrestlers Chris Benoit, Kurt Angle, Dean Malenko, Rey Mysterio, Chris Jericho, JBL, and Batista. He was the godfather of Rey Mysterio's son Dominik Mysterio.

Guerrero was a born-again Christian.

Death 
On November 13, 2005, Guerrero was found unconscious in his hotel room at the Marriott Hotel City Center in Minneapolis, Minnesota, by his nephew, Chavo. In a 2020 interview for the documentary Dark Side of the Ring, Chavo explained that Eddie had passed out in the hotel room bathroom with a toothbrush in his hand, and was barely clinging to life when Chavo discovered him. Eddie Guerrero was pronounced dead upon the ambulance arriving at the scene. He was 38 years old. An autopsy revealed that Guerrero died as a result of acute heart failure due to underlying atherosclerotic cardiovascular disease.  He is interred at Green Acres Memorial Park Cemetery in Scottsdale, Arizona. His funeral service was officiated by "Superstar" Billy Graham who also has a burial plot near Guerrero.

The episodes of Raw on November 14, 2005, and SmackDown! on November 18, 2005 (both filmed November 13, 2005), each aired as tributes to Guerrero. All storylines were put on hold, and no WWE employees were forced to perform, although several matches took place, including one featuring Chavo, who finished the match with his uncle's finishing maneuver the frog splash. Raw started with all the wrestlers and numerous backstage personnel on stage, as Vince McMahon addressed the live crowd before finishing with a ten-bell salute. In addition to the Raw and SmackDown! tribute shows, Total Nonstop Action Wrestling (TNA) dedicated the pay-per-view Genesis (which aired the evening of his death) to Guerrero, while Ring of Honor (ROH) named their next show "Night of Tribute". Ohio Valley Wrestling (OVW), WWE's then developmental territory, also paid tribute to Guerrero on their television taping following his death. Many of the wrestlers there wore armbands with "E.G." on them. Eventually, other wrestlers, primarily his nephew Chavo and friends Mysterio and Christian Cage, paid tribute to him in their matches by using the Frog Splash, Guerrero's finisher. Combat Zone Wrestling also paid tribute to Guerrero with a ten-bell salute during one of their cards. Wrestlers CM Punk and Rey Mysterio dedicated some of their matches to Guerrero. The 3 Doors Down song "Here Without You" was used as a tribute song for Guerrero, as was Johnny Cash's "Hurt".

Legacy 
Guerrero is regarded as one of the greatest in-ring performers of all time. In a poll of the WWE roster, he was ranked the 11th greatest professional wrestler of all time. Ric Flair ranked Guerrero as one of his top 10 opponents, while Chris Jericho said he was the best performer in the world when he was "on". Kurt Angle named Guerrero as the second greatest professional wrestler of all time, behind Shawn Michaels, stating: "[Eddie] could have been the absolute greatest of all time because when I wrestled, he was still in that top three we were talking about, so Eddie had it all. He was so entertaining, but he also had all the technique. He was such a great wrestler and he got it. He got finishes. He knew how to structure them." WWE named Guerrero one of the most beloved and accomplished WWE superstars of all time, one of the best technical wrestlers ever, and the fifth greatest performer in the history of the company's SmackDown brand.

Championships and accomplishments 

 Asistencia Asesoría y Administración
 AAA World Tag Team Championship (1 time) – with Art Barr
 AAA Hall of Fame (Class of 2008)
 Cauliflower Alley Club
 Men's Wrestling Award (2008) 
 Extreme Championship Wrestling
 ECW World Television Championship (2 times)
 Hardcore Hall of Fame
Class of 2015
 Independent Wrestling Association Mid-South
 IWA Mid-South Heavyweight Championship (1 time)
 Latin American Wrestling Association
 LAWA Heavyweight Championship (1 time)
 New Japan Pro-Wrestling
 Best of the Super Juniors III (1996)
 Junior Heavyweight Super Grade Tag League (1996) – with The Great Sasuke
 Pro Wrestling Federation
 PWF World Tag Team Championship (1 time) – with Héctor Guerrero
 Pro Wrestling Illustrated
 Comeback of the Year (1999)
 Inspirational Wrestler of the Year (2002, 2004)
 Stanley Weston Award (2005)
 Ranked No. 2 of the top 500 wrestlers in the PWI 500 in 2004
 Ranked No. 81 of the top 500 wrestlers of the "PWI Years" in 2003
 Ranked No. 18 of the top 100 tag teams of the "PWI Years" with Art Barr in 2003
 World Championship Wrestling
 WCW Cruiserweight Championship (2 times)
 WCW United States Heavyweight Championship (1 time)
WCW United States Championship Tournament (1996)
Battlebowl Championship Ring (1996)
 World Cup Of Wrestling (1995) - with Randy Savage, Lex Luger, Johnny B. Badd, Sting, Chris Benoit, and Alex Wright
 World Wrestling All-Stars
 WWA International Cruiserweight Championship (1 time)
 World Wrestling Association
 WWA Trios Championship (1 time) – with Chavo Guerrero and Mando Guerrero
 WWA World Welterweight Championship (1 time)
 World Wrestling Federation/World Wrestling Entertainment
 WWE Championship (1 time)
 WWF European Championship (2 times)
 WWE United States Championship (1 time)
 WWF/WWE Intercontinental Championship (2 times)
 WWE Tag Team Championship (4 times) – with Chavo Guerrero (2), Tajiri (1) and Rey Mysterio (1)
 WWE Hall of Fame (Class of 2006)
WWE United States Championship Tournament (2003)
15-man SmackDown! Royal Rumble (2004)
 Eleventh Triple Crown Champion
 Sixth Grand Slam Champion
 Wrestling Observer Newsletter
 Best on Interviews (2005)
 Feud of the Year (1994) Los Gringos Locos vs. AAA
 Feud of the Year (1995) vs. Dean Malenko
 Most Charismatic (2004, 2005)
 Tag Team of the Year (1994) with Art Barr as La Pareja del Terror
 Tag Team of the Year (2002) with Chavo Guerrero as Los Guerreros
 Wrestling Observer Newsletter Hall of Fame (Class of 2006)

Luchas de Apuestas record

See also
 List of premature professional wrestling deaths

References

External links 

 
 
 

1967 births
2005 deaths
20th-century professional wrestlers
21st-century professional wrestlers
American male professional wrestlers
American professional wrestlers of Mexican descent
Christians from Texas
ECW World Television Champions
Expatriate professional wrestlers in Japan
Los Guerreros
Masked wrestlers
NWA/WCW/WWE United States Heavyweight Champions
Professional wrestlers from Texas
Sportspeople from El Paso, Texas
The Latino World Order members
WWE Hall of Fame inductees
WWF European Champions
WWF/WWE Intercontinental Champions
WWE Champions
WWE Grand Slam champions
AAA World Tag Team Champions
WCW/WWE Cruiserweight Champions